The Toleranzpreis der Evangelischen Akademie Tutzing (Prize for tolerance) is a prize that has been awarded biennially by the Evangelische Akademie Tutzing to personalities who have been influential towards a dialogue between cultures and religions. From 2012, an additional prize has been given to support moral courage (Preis zur Förderung der Zivilcourage).

Recipients 
The prize was given to:
 2000 Roman Herzog
 2002 Daniel Barenboim
 2004 Henning Mankell
 2006 Aga Khan IV
 2008 Shirin Ebadi
 2010 Wolfgang Schäuble
 2012 Peter Maffay; category Zivilcourage: Bayerisches Bündnis für Toleranz
 2014 Christian Wulff; category Zivilcourage: 
 2016 Frank-Walter Steinmeier, 
 2018 Emmanuel Macron; category Zivilcourage
 2020 Dunja Hayali; category Zivilcourage
 2022

References 

German awards
European human rights awards